Sam Barthe School for Boys, or Barthe as it was locally known, was an all-boys private school that existed for more than forty years in Metairie, Louisiana, in Jefferson Parish in the Greater New Orleans area. It featured a spartan lifefstyle and a broad education in both college preparatory academics and sports. Initially it was for boys up through 8th grade but extended its age range through 12th grade in the late 1960s.

History

Origins

The school was started in 1941 by its namesake, Sam Barthe, a local man who had been a track star at Istrouma High School in Baton Rouge.  He created a no-nonsense competitive environment to train young boys and teens in all aspects of their growth into adulthood. The school was originally located in uptown New Orleans on Gen. Pershing, then was relocated to the old McFadden residence in City Park in New Orleans, now the residence of the Christian Brothers. The school emphasized athletics and physical well-being, and all boys were encouraged to try out for organized team sports.

Relocation

In early September 1959, spurred by the need for more space for his growing student body, better athletic facilities, and suburban sprawl, Barthe built a new facility in the New Orleans suburb of Metairie, near the intersection of Transcontinental and West Esplanade. The school facility was unusual for the South,  eventually featuring three buildings of non-air-conditioned classrooms, divided by the age group of the students, each surrounding its own custom basketball court or gymnasium.   The school flourished in the new location for twenty years.

Extra-curricular activities

Although the school may be best known for its athletic prowess, it also maintained a reputation as an elite educational facility, consistently producing its share of National Merit Scholarship finalists in the New Orleans metro area. The school was also a perennial power in the local scholastic Prep Quiz Bowl, a popular televised game show hosted by Mel Levitt.  Much like the popular quiz show Jeopardy!, the Prep Quiz Bowl featured teams of highly gifted academic students from schools of all sizes from around the region, testing students knowledge and game strategy in a head-to-head elimination tournament lasting several weeks.  Sam Barthe won at least two PQB championships in the mid-1970s.

Athletics

Barthe was a strong adherent to the belief that athletics should be a part of all students life and curriculum. The school offered teams for all ages of boys, including swim teams, track & field, tennis, football, baseball, and basketball. It became known over the years as an athletic powerhouse across the city with its teams winning many district, regional, and state championships. The school also ran intramural sports leagues for the enrolled students, focusing on the Hornet Football League and the Biddy Basketball League. All teams were composed of students in elementary and Jr. High grades, ensuring every boy had a chance to play organized sports. Barthe was one of the only schools in the state to have an official "biddy" basketball regulation court (8'6" goals), and marked off in the official "key" formations and which was used primarily for its intramural league.  

In the early years, Sam Barthe school was associated with local public and parochial schools in the area, competing both physically and academically with any school of its similar student enrollment of 450-800 students.  In the late 1960s, when racial desegregation became federal law, the previously all-white New Orleans public school system began to accept minority students.  Barthe then switched athletic affiliation from the integrated Louisiana High School Athletic Association (LHSAA) to the Louisiana Independent School Association (LISA) so as to compete with the remaining other private "all-white" schools, such as St. Martins, Newman, Country Day, Kehoe Academy, and Prytania Private School.  When those schools began to take a more liberal stance towards racial policy in the 1970s, the school re-affiliated again, joining a more conservative, geographically diverse athletic association for the remainder of its years of operation.  

This change of conferences eliminated the local sports rivalries that had kept the school so predominantly in the public eye. Some students left the school, choosing to attend other more moderate private and parochial schools. But overall, enrollment kept growing and new rivalries from more distant schools, such as Central Private, Riverside, and Reserve, began to form.  Some out-of-states rivals also appeared, such as Indianola Academy and Jackson Prep, both in Mississippi. The school won a championship in football in 1976 as a member of the Louisiana Independent School Association (LISA).

Termination

The school property was sold in 1979 to another private school, L'Ecole Classique. Existing Barthe students were merged into Ecole Classique, which is still in operation on the Metairie campus.  Barthe ceased to exist as a school in late 1979.  

Barthe himself retired to his "farm" in a rural area outside of New Orleans with his wife of many years, known to Sam and students as "Mama".  Past students who visited them over the years reported that his "farm house" was packed to the walls with the many awards, trophies, and photos of students he accumulated during his four decades as headmaster of the school. Sam Barthe died in 1998.

References

Schools in Jefferson Parish, Louisiana
Defunct schools in Louisiana
Educational institutions established in 1941
1941 establishments in Louisiana
1979 disestablishments in Louisiana
Educational institutions disestablished in 1979